Grevillea pyramidalis, commonly known as the caustic bush, is a species of flowering plant in the family Proteaceae and is endemic to north-western Australia. It is an erect, spindly shrub or small tree with simple linear or pinnatisect leaves with linear to narrowly egg-shaped lobes, and white to yellow or cream-coloured flowers.

Description

Taxonomy
Grevillea pyramidalis was first formally described in 1830 by Robert Brown from an unpublished description by Allan Cunningham and the description was published in Supplementum primum prodromi florae Novae Hollandiae. The specific epithet (pyramidalis) means "pyramidal", referring to the shape of the flower clusters.

Three subspecies of G. pyramidalis have been described, and the names are accepted by the Australian Plant Census:
 Grevillea pyramidalis subsp. leucadendron (A.Cunn. ex R.Br.)
 Grevillea pyramidalis subsp. longiloba (F.Muell.)
 Grevillea pyramidalis (A.Cunn. ex R.Br.)

Distribution and habitat
Caustic bush grows in a range of soil types. Subspecies leucadendron grows in open grassy woodland in the Carnarvon, Central Kimberley, Dampierland, Great Sandy Desert, Northern Kimberley, Ord Victoria Plain, Pilbara, Tanami and Victoria Bonaparte bioregions of northern Western Australia and the Northern Territory. Subspecies longiloba grows in open grassy woodland in the Northern Territory, mainly in the Katherine area and subsp. pyramidalis grows in low woodland between Broome and the Prince Regent River in north-western Western Australia.

See also
 List of Grevillea species

References

pyramidalis
Proteales of Australia
Eudicots of Western Australia
Flora of the Northern Territory
Plants described in 1830
Taxa named by Robert Brown (botanist, born 1773)